Hungary was represented by boyband V.I.P., with the song "Miért kell, hogy elmenj?", at the Eurovision Song Contest 1997, which took place on 3 May in Dublin. "Miért kell, hogy elmenj?" was chosen as the Hungarian entry at the national final on 28 February.

Before Eurovision

National final 
The national final was organised by broadcaster Magyar Televízió (MTV) and was held at their studios in Budapest, hosted by István Vágó. 19 songs took part with the winner being chosen by voting from five regional juries, who each awarded 10-7-5-3-1 to their top five songs.

At Eurovision 
Heading into the final of the contest, RTÉ reported that bookmakers ranked the entry 8th out of the 25 entries. On the night of the final V.I.P. performed 19th in the running order, following Malta and preceding Russia. At the close of voting "Miért kell, hogy elmenj?" had picked up 39 points, placing Hungary joint 12th (with Greece) of the 25 entries. The Hungarian jury awarded its 12 points to contest winners the United Kingdom.

Voting

References 

1997
Countries in the Eurovision Song Contest 1997
Eurovision